Xylocopa fenestrata, or Xylocopa (Ctenoxylocopa) fenestrata, is a species of carpenter bee. It is widely distributed in Asian countries and very few African countries such as Madagascar and Seychelles. It is considered as a pest of timber and bamboo, but is also a valuable pollinator.

References

External links
 Itis.gov
 Animaldiversity.org
 Flickr.com

Further reading
Ruggiero M. (project leader), Ascher J. et al. (2013). ITIS Bees: World Bee Checklist (version Sep 2009). In: Species 2000 & ITIS Catalogue of Life, 11 March 2013 (Roskov Y., Kunze T., Paglinawan L., Orrell T., Nicolson D., Culham A., Bailly N., Kirk P., Bourgoin T., Baillargeon G., Hernandez F., De Wever A., eds). Digital resource at www.catalogueoflife.org/col/. Species 2000: Reading, UK.
John Ascher, Connal Eardley, Terry Griswold, Gabriel Melo, Andrew Polaszek, Michael Ruggiero, Paul Williams, Ken Walker, and Natapot Warrit.

fenestrata
Fauna of Southeast Asia
Insects described in 1798